The survival of some microorganisms exposed to outer space has been studied using both simulated facilities and low Earth orbit exposures. Bacteria were some of the first organisms investigated, when in 1960 a Russian satellite carried Escherichia coli, Staphylococcus, and Enterobacter aerogenes into orbit. Many kinds of microorganisms have been selected for exposure experiments since, as listed in the table below.

Experiments of the adaption of microbes in space have yielded unpredictable results. While sometimes the microorganism may weaken, they can also increase in their disease-causing potency.

It is possible to classify these microorganisms into two groups, the human-borne and the extremophiles. Studying the human-borne microorganisms is significant for human welfare and future crewed missions in space, whilst the extremophiles are vital for studying the physiological requirements of survival in space. NASA has pointed out that normal adults have ten times as many microbial cells as human cells in their bodies. They are also nearly everywhere in the environment and, although normally invisible, can form slimy biofilms.

Extremophiles have adapted to live in some of the most extreme environments on Earth. This includes hypersaline lakes, arid regions, deep sea, acidic sites, cold and dry polar regions and permafrost. The existence of extremophiles has led to the speculation that microorganisms could survive the harsh conditions of extraterrestrial environments and be used as model organisms to understand the fate of biological systems in these environments. The focus of many experiments has been to investigate the possible survival of organisms inside rocks (lithopanspermia), or their survival on Mars for understanding the likelihood of past or present life on that planet. Because of their ubiquity and resistance to spacecraft decontamination, bacterial spores are considered likely potential forward contaminants on robotic missions to Mars. Measuring the resistance of such organisms to space conditions can be applied to develop adequate decontamination procedures.

Research and testing of microorganisms in outer space could eventually be applied for directed panspermia or terraforming.

Table

See also 

Misc
 Animals in space
 Astrobiology
 Earliest known life forms
 Extremophiles
 Health threat from cosmic rays
 Interplanetary contamination
 Microscopic life
 Panspermia and directed panspermia
 Plants in space
 Space research

Low Earth orbit missions
 Bion
 BIOPAN
 Biosatellite program
 EXPOSE
 O/OREOS
Tanpopo

References

Astrobiology
Astrobiology space missions
Biology-related lists
Lists of bacteria
Extremophiles
Life in space
Medical lists
Microbiology
Science-related lists
Space medicine
Space science experiments
+